Lycaste powellii is a species of terrestrial orchid endemic to Panama.

References

External links 

powellii
Orchids of Panama
Endemic flora of Panama